Rafael Mijares Alcérreca (23 September 1924 – 9 November 2015) was a Mexican architect and painter.

Biography 
Mijares studied at Universidad Nacional Autónoma de México (UNAM), and designed a lot of notable buildings, amongst others fifteen markets in Mexico City between 1955 and 1957, together with Pedro Ramírez Vázquez, Juan José Díaz Infante Núñez and Javier Echeverría. Together with Ramírez Vázquez he also designed the Estadio Azteca in 1962, and the Museo de Arte Moderno in 1964. Also with Ramírez Vázquez and Jorge Campuzano, he designed the Museo Nacional de Antropología. He participated in the Mexican pavilion at World's fair exhibitions in Seattle, Washington and New York.
In 1970, he designed the office building of the Secretaría de Relaciones Exteriores. Together with J. Francisco Serrano Cacho he reconstructed the buildings of the Universidad Iberoamericana's university campus buildings, which were destroyed due to an earthquake in 1979.

Mijares was multiple awarded, amongst others with the Belgian Order of Leopold II.

He also visited courses in José Lazcarro's atelier in the “Molino de Santo Domingo”, and started abstract painting in 1978.

Gallery

External links

References 

1924 births
2015 deaths
Mexican architects
20th-century Mexican painters
20th-century male artists
Mexican male painters
21st-century Mexican painters
21st-century male artists
People from Mexico City
Recipients of the Order of Leopold II
Abstract artists
National Autonomous University of Mexico alumni